The Men’s Doubles tournament of the 1985 US Indoor Tennis Championships took place in Memphis, US, between 28 January and 3 February 1985. 32 players (16 pairs) from 17 countries competed in the 5-round tournament. The winning doubles pair was Pavel Složil and Tomáš Šmíd, both of Czechoslovakia, who defeated Kevin Curren and Steve Denton, both of the US.

Seeds

Draw

Final

Top half

Bottom half

References
 1985 US National Indoor Doubles Draw

U.S. Indoor Championships
U.S. National Indoor Championships